Boidie is a small town and commune in the Cercle of Barouéli in the Ségou Region of southern-central Mali. In 1998 the commune had a population of 17,645.

References

Communes of Ségou Region